The Victoria Towers are a high-rise residential development located in the Tsim Sha Tsui area of Hong Kong.

The complex is located at No.188 Canton Road, at the intersection with Austin Road and was designed by Rocco Design Architects Limited and developed by Cheung Kong Holdings and Hutchison Whampoa Properties. Construction began in 2000 and was completed in 2003. The base of the complex is occupied by the Victoria Mall shopping centre.

Buildings of the complex

See also
List of tallest buildings in Hong Kong

References

Residential buildings completed in 2003
Residential skyscrapers in Hong Kong